SEED Madagascar (formerly Azafady UK) is a registered UK charity and Malagasy non-governmental organisation, established in 2000, working in southeast Madagascar to alleviate poverty, improve well-being and protect unique environments. SEED Madagascar works with communities among the poorest people in Madagascar, the Antanosy people, around the last remaining stands of littoral forest in southeast Madagascar.

Goals
SEED Madagascar actively supports projects that bring measurable benefits to the poorest members of village communities where help is most needed. Although founded to protect the environment, SEED Madagascar's 'on the ground' work is all about people: their health, their education, their workload, their ability to raise their families and their ability to survive alongside the forest, upon which they depend.

External links 
SEED Madagascar's website

 Menard, Nicole N. (2008). Evolution and evaluation of a non-governmental organization in southeastern Madagascar: A case study of Azafady. Masters Thesis, University of Oregon.

Development charities based in the United Kingdom
Environmental organisations based in Madagascar
Foreign charities operating in Madagascar